Mont Ngafula is a municipality (commune) in the Lukunga district of Kinshasa, the capital city of the Democratic Republic of the Congo.

It is in the hilly southern area of Kinshasa and is intersected by the Lukaya River valley in its southern portion.
The boundary with the Ngaliema commune is defined by the Lukunga River.

Residence in the area is relatively new; in the 1970s, it became home to a small number of upper and middle-class business executives, politicians and other relatively affluent people. However, many of the would-be extravagant compounds commissioned remain incomplete, mainly due to the drastic economic decline that characterized the latter portion of the Mobutu era.

Demographics

See also 

 Claudine André

References 

Communes of Kinshasa
Lukunga District